Gareth Haggerty (born 8 September 1981) is a former Ireland international rugby league footballer. He played for the Widnes Vikings in the Co-operative Championship. He previously played for Harlequins RL, St Helens and the Salford City Reds all of whom play in the Super League.

He is a specialist impact player, coming off the interchange bench.

Background
Haggerty was born in St Helens, Merseyside, England.

He is the son of former St. Helens forward Roy Haggerty.

Career
He was a member of the Ireland squad for the 2008 Rugby League World Cup. Although relatively unknown in Australia prior to the tournament, his performances from the bench in the World Cup earned widespread praise from both fans and pundits, with many Australians going as far as to chant 'sign him up' during games.

References

External links
 Quins profile
Ireland profile
(archived by web.archive.org) Salford Profile
(archived by web.archive.org) SL Stats
(archived by web.archive.org) Salford Career Stats
Saints Heritage Society profile
Players to watch - Gareth Haggerty (Ireland)

1981 births
Living people
English people of Irish descent
English rugby league players
Ireland national rugby league team players
London Broncos players
Rugby league props
Rugby league players from St Helens, Merseyside
Rugby league second-rows
Salford Red Devils players
St Helens R.F.C. players
Widnes Vikings players